Anolis uniformis, the  lesser scaly anole, is a species of lizard in the family Dactyloidae. The species is found in Mexico, Belize, Guatemala, and Honduras.

References

Anoles
Reptiles of Mexico
Reptiles of Belize
Reptiles of Guatemala
Reptiles of Honduras
Reptiles described in 1885
Taxa named by Edward Drinker Cope